Charles Clark (26 July 1866 – 15 September 1950) was a New Zealand cricketer. He played nine first-class matches for Canterbury between 1895 and 1898.

References

External links
 

1866 births
1950 deaths
New Zealand cricketers
Canterbury cricketers
Cricketers from Christchurch